

Claravale is a locality in the Northern Territory of Australia about  south of the territory capital of Darwin.

The locality's boundaries and name were gazetted on 4 April 2007. Its name is derived from the pastoral station of the same name.

The 2016 Australian census which was conducted in August 2016 reports that Claravale had a population of 10 people.

Claravale is located within the federal division of Lingiari, the territory electoral division of Stuart and the local government area of the Victoria Daly Region.

References

Populated places in the Northern Territory
Victoria Daly Region